A Twelve-Year Night is a 2018 Uruguayan drama film directed by Álvaro Brechner. It premiered in Official Selection at the 75th Venice International Film Festival, and it was selected as the Uruguayan entry for the Best Foreign Language Film at the 91st Academy Awards, but it was not nominated. The film won the Golden Pyramid Award at the 40th Cairo International Film Festival.

It dramatises the experiences of José Mujica, Mauricio Rosencof and Eleuterio Fernández Huidobro. Mujica later became the 40th president of Uruguay from 2010 to 2015.

Plot
In 1973 Uruguay, the country is ruled by a civic-military dictatorship, and the National Army is embroiled in guerilla warfare with the leftist Tupamaros group. Three Tupamaros members, José "Pepe" Mujica, Mauricio Rosencof and Eleuterio Fernández Huidobro, are held as hostages in a government-run prison. In the next twelve years, they are repeatedly relocated to military bases around the country.

As the military is unable to kill the men owing to international pressure, it decides to torment them mentally instead. The hostages are subjected to petty rules and abuses, including solitary confinement and a mock execution. Under pressure from the hostages' families, the military chief permits a brief reunion in the prison grounds, but warns the men to be silent.

In 1975, Pepe is separated from the trio and held at the bottom of a grain silo. After a prolonged period, he experiences mental delusions and begins hallucinating about his mother. In another prison, Rosencof strikes up an acquaintance with sergeant Alzamora, and assists him in composing a letter to a girl. The three men are reunited and transported to an underground prison in 1978. Amongst the three, Pepe is locked up in complete isolation in his cell, worsening his condition. He relieves the memories of his capture and fears that they will be forgotten in the years to come.

The hostages are shifted to another prison with better conditions and given special privileges in a ruse to fool a visiting Red Cross delegation, which are revoked when the delegation leaves. During the process, a bar of soap with inscriptions is discovered in Huidobro's possession. He is subjected to questioning which exonerates him of any malicious intent, though the military chief expresses regret in not having killed him.

After items delivered by his mother are misappropriated, Pepe causes a commotion at a military event held near his cell, and is ordered to see a psychiatrist. She promises to raise awareness of his condition. In 1980, the government is defeated in a referendum to amend the constitution to provide the military with a leading role.

In 1983, the hostages are returned to another prison, and Rosencof meets sergeant Alzamora, now a chief guard. Alzamora reveals that he is now married and expresses gratitude to Rosencof, allowing the three men a greater degree of freedom under his custody. In 1985, the military releases the three men amongst other political prisoners in a general amnesty, and they reunite with their families.

Cast
 Antonio de la Torre as José Mujica
 Chino Darín as Mauricio Rosencof
 Alfonso Tort as Eleuterio Fernández Huidobro
 César Troncoso as military chief
 César Bordón as sergeant Alzamora
 Soledad Villamil as psychiatrist
 Mirella Pascual as Lucy Cordano

Reception

Critical response

Awards
A Twelve-Year Night won the Golden Pyramid Award at the 40th Cairo International Film Festival on 29 November 2018. The film received six nominations for the 6th Platino Awards, including Best Ibero-American Film and Best Director.

See also
 List of submissions to the 91st Academy Awards for Best Foreign Language Film
 List of Uruguayan submissions for the Academy Award for Best Foreign Language Film

References

External links
 

2018 films
2018 drama films
2018 biographical drama films
2010s Spanish-language films
2010s Spanish films
2010s French films
2010s prison drama films
Uruguayan drama films
Spanish drama films
Argentine drama films
French drama films
German drama films
Films scored by Federico Jusid
Films set in Uruguay
2010s German films
2010s Argentine films